Draper Island may refer to: